"Squeeze Box" is a song by the Who from their album The Who by Numbers. Written by Pete Townshend, the lyrics are couched in sexual double entendres. Unlike many of the band's other hits, the song features country-like elements, as heard in Townshend's guitar fingerpicking.

"Squeeze Box" was a commercial success, peaking at No. 10 on the UK Singles Chart and No. 16 in the US Billboard Hot 100. The song is also their only international number-one hit, reaching No. 1 in Canada, and No. 2 on the Irish singles chart.

Background
"Squeeze Box" was originally intended for a Who television special planned in 1974. In the planned performance of the song, the members of the band were to be surrounded by 100 topless women playing accordions.

A demo of the song featured a farfisa organ-based arrangement, as well as bluegrass banjos. Authors Steve Grantley and Alan Parker compared this early version to The Beatles' 1968 song, "Ob-La-Di, Ob-La-Da". This demo appeared on Pete Townshend's demo collection, Scoop.

"Squeezebox" is a slang term for accordions and related instruments. The song's lyrics consist mostly of sexual innuendo. Although Pete Townshend later said that the song originated as a dirty joke, he said that there was no double entendre, claiming "It's not about a woman's breasts, vaginal walls, or anything else of the ilk." The Who's bassist, John Entwistle also commented on the lyrics, saying "I dunno. Most songs have double meanings or no meaning at all. 'Squeeze Box' isn't that dirty. It doesn't say 'tits. Lead singer Roger Daltrey, however, acknowledged the double meaning, saying, "There's nothing wrong with a bit of 'in-and-out,' mate!"

"Squeeze Box" was released as the first single from The Who by Numbers in 1975 in America and 1976 in Britain. It became an international hit, becoming the band's first Top 10 hit in Britain since 1972's "Join Together". Despite this, Pete Townshend did not think highly of the song, and was astonished at its chart success.

Roger Daltrey, however, spoke positively of the song, praising its simplicity.

Record World said that "the group gives a display of their tremendous creative powers; a lilting rocker with all the immediacy of a 'Happy Jack.'"

PopMatters critic David Pike rated it one of the "41 essential pop/rock songs with accordion."

Song composition
 
The song is written in three stanzas using the same closing refrain of "Mama's got a squeeze box/ Daddy never sleeps at night". The content of each stanza builds on the innuendo of the colloquial phrase of referring to a romantic partner as being some variation of being a "main squeeze" or simply referring to a boyfriend or girlfriend as a "squeeze". The first stanza is relatively ambiguous and introduces the main rhythm and beat of the song followed by the first instance of the refrain. The second stanza becomes more explicit with the romantic couple ignoring their pets and even their children when their nighttime activity commences stating, "'Cause she's playing all night", followed by the refrain. The third stanza becomes relatively undisguised in its use of metaphor referring to the couple's romantic activity as "in and out and in and out", followed by the closing instance of the refrain. The original version of the end of the song included the intonation of the words, "She goes, squeeze me, come on and squeeze me, Come on…", as the music faded out.

Live performances
The song was first performed live at the New Bingley Hall in Stafford on 3 October 1975, and remained in the set for the rest of the 1975–1976 tour, until drummer Keith Moon's final North American concert at the Maple Leaf Gardens in Toronto on 21 October 1976. The band later played it again in the last leg of the 1982 Tour. The song was performed live again in 2014 during The Who Hits 50! tour.

Chart performance

Weekly charts
The Who

Freddy Fender

Year-end charts

Personnel
Roger Daltrey – lead vocals
Pete Townshend – guitar, banjo, accordion, backing vocals
John Entwistle – bass, backing vocals
Keith Moon – drums

Other versions 
Freddy Fender did the first cover of "Squeeze Box," in 1979. It was included on his 14th studio album, The Texas Balladeer. The song became a hit on the U.S. Country chart, reaching #61.
Laura Branigan recorded a version of this song for her second studio album, Branigan 2, in 1983.

Poison recorded a version of the song and released it as a promo single from the album Hollyweird in March 2002. The song was re-released in 2007 on their album Poison'd, where all the tracks are cover songs. Bobby Dall said on the cover of "Squeeze Box":

References

External links
 Lyrics of this song
 
 

The Who songs
1975 singles
RPM Top Singles number-one singles
Freddy Fender songs
McBride & the Ride songs
Laura Branigan songs
2002 singles
Poison (American band) songs
Songs written by Pete Townshend
Song recordings produced by Glyn Johns
Polydor Records singles
MCA Records singles
1975 songs